Lord Adolphus Frederick Charles William Vane-Tempest (2 July 1825 – 11 June 1864), known until 1854 as Lord Adolphus Vane, was a Conservative Party politician in the United Kingdom.

He was the fourth child (and second son) of Charles Vane, 3rd Marquess of Londonderry and his wife Frances Anne Vane, Marchioness of Londonderry.

In December 1852, he was elected at a by-election as Member of Parliament (MP) for the City of Durham, but the election was overturned on petition the next year.

In 1854 he was elected unopposed to the House of Commons as MP for North Durham after the death of his father, filling the seat vacated by his elder brother George Vane-Tempest, Viscount Seaham, who succeeded to the peerage as Earl Vane. He held the seat until his death in 1864, aged 38.

During the enthusiasm for the Volunteer Movement in 1859–60, although his brothers were connected with the 2nd (Seaham) Durham Artillery Volunteer Corps formed at the family's Seaham Colliery, Lord Adolphus raised and commanded an infantry corps, the Sunderland Rifles.

According to Anne Isba, author and Victorian Studies scholar, Vane was "notoriously unstable" and was "described by Queen Victoria as having 'a natural tendency to madness.'  Vane, who on one occasion violently attacked his wife and infant son, died four years later during a struggle with four keepers."

Ancestry

References

External links
 

1825 births
1864 deaths
Conservative Party (UK) MPs for English constituencies
UK MPs 1852–1857
UK MPs 1857–1859
UK MPs 1859–1865
Younger sons of marquesses
Adolphus
Members of the Parliament of the United Kingdom for City of Durham